For centuries, Spain recruited foreign soldiers to its army, forming the Foreign Regiments - such as the Regiment of Hibernia (formed in 1709 from Irishmen who fled their own country in the wake of the Flight of the Earls and the penal laws). However, the specific unit of the Spanish Army and Spain's Rapid Reaction Force, now known as the Spanish Legion, and informally known as the Tercio or the Tercios, is a 20th-century creation. It was raised in the 1920s to serve as part of Spain's Army of Africa.

Although foreign recruitment spans the Spanish-speaking nations, the majority of recruits are Spaniards.

The Legion played a major role in the Nationalist forces in the Spanish Civil War. In  post-Franco Spain, the modern Legion has undertaken tours of duty in the Yugoslav Wars, Afghanistan, Iraq and Operation Libre Hidalgo UNIFIL.

History
The Spanish Legion was formed by royal decree of King Alfonso XIII on 28 January 1920, with the Minister of War  stating, "With the designation of Foreigners Regiment there will be created an armed military unit, whose recruits, uniform and regulations by which they should be governed will be set by the minister of war." In the 1920s the Spanish Legion's five battalions were filled primarily by native Spaniards (since foreigners were not easy to recruit) with most of its foreign members coming from the Republic of Cuba.

Predecessor
Historically there had been a "Spanish Foreign Legion" which preceded the modern Legion's formation in 1920. On 28 June 1835, the French government had decided to hand over to the Spanish government the French Foreign Legion in support of Queen Isabella's claim to the Spanish throne during the First Carlist War. The French Foreign Legion, with around 4,000 men, landed at Tarragona on 17 August 1835. This became the first Spanish Legion until it was disbanded on 8 December 1838, when it had dropped to only 500 men.

The Title of Spanish Legion

The Spanish Legion was modelled on the French Foreign Legion. Its purpose was to provide a corps of professional troops to fight in Spain's colonial campaigns in North Africa, in place of conscript units that were proving ineffective.  The first commanding officer, Lieutenant Colonel José Millán-Astray Terreros, referred to his unit as ‘La Legión’ from the start but this only became part of the unit's title from 1937.

In the original  there were, amongst others, one Chinese, three Japanese, one Maltese, one Russian, and one black American. However, soon the majority of its members were Spaniards who joined to fight outside of European Spain.

 is an old Spanish military term that roughly translates as ‘regiment' (originally it had enough manpower to be considered a half-brigade). In the 18th century tercios were replaced by regiments. There is no equivalent word in English. Dating from the 16th century, the name was chosen to evoke the era of Spain's military supremacy as the leading Catholic power in Europe under the Habsburg Emperors. Organised into  in 1534, the Spanish infantry gained a reputation for invincibility.

This was soon abbreviated to ‘The Tercio’.

Early campaigns
The Spanish Legion's first major campaign was in Spanish North Africa.  In 1920 Spain was facing a major rebellion in the Protectorate of Spanish Morocco, led by the able Rif leader Abd el-Krim. On 2 September 1920, King Alfonso XIII conferred command of the new regiment on Lieutenant Colonel of Infantry José Millán-Astray, chief proponent of its establishment. Millán-Astray was an able soldier but an eccentric and extreme personality. His style and attitude would become part of the mystique of the legion.

On 20 September 1920 the first recruit joined the new legion, a date which is now celebrated annually. The initial make-up of the regiment was that of a headquarters unit and three battalions (known as Banderas,  lit. "banners"- another archaic 16th century term). Each battalion was in turn made up of a headquarters company, two rifle companies and a machine gun company. The regiment's initial location was at the Cuartel del Rey en Ceuta on the Plaza de Colón. At its height, during the Spanish Civil War, the legion consisted of 18 banderas, plus a tank bandera, an assault engineer bandera and a Special Operations Group. Banderas 12 to 18 were considered independent units and never served as part of the additional tercios into which the legion was organised.

Francisco Franco was one of the leaders of the legion and the unit's second-in-command, concurrently commanding the 1st Legion Bandera. The legion fought in Morocco in the War of the Rif (to 1926). Together with the Regulares (Moorish colonial troops), the legion made up the Spanish Army of Africa. In October 1934 units of both the legion and the Regulares were brought to Spain by the Republican Government to help put down a workers revolt in the area of Asturias.

Under the leadership of Lieutenant Colonel Juan Yagüe the Army of Africa played an important part in the Spanish Civil War on the Nationalist side. The professionalism of both the legion and the Regulares gave Franco's rebel troops a significant initial advantage over the less well trained Spanish Republican forces. The Army of Africa remained an elite spearhead until the expansion of the rebel armies after April 1937 led to the legion and Moroccan units being distributed across several fronts. Following the Francoist victory in 1939, the legion was reduced in size and returned to its bases in Spanish Morocco. It was only after then that the legion attained its present composition of 4 Tercios, and the names given to them, the 4th Tercio of the legion was established later in 1950:

  1st Tercio "Great Captain Gonzalo Fernandez de Cordoba"
  2nd Tercio "Fernando Alvarez de Toledo, Duke of Alba"
  3rd Tercio "Don Juan de Austria"
  4th Tercio "Alexander Farnese, Duke of Parma"

When Morocco gained its independence in 1956 the legion continued in existence as part of the garrison of the remaining Spanish enclaves and territories in North Africa. The legion fought Arab irregulars in the Ifni War in 1957–58.

On 17 June 1970, Legion units opened fire and killed between two and eleven demonstrators at the Zemla neighbourhood in El Aaiun, Spanish Sahara, modern day Western Sahara. The incident, which became known as the Zemla Intifada, had a significant influence on pushing the Sahrawi anticolonial movement into embarking on an armed struggle which continues, though Spain has long since abandoned the territory and handed it over to Morocco.

Through the course of the legion's history Spaniards (including natives of the colony of Spanish Guinea) have made up the majority of its members, with foreigners accounting for 25 percent or less. During the Rif War of the 1920s most of the Foreigners serving with the legion were Spanish speaking Latin Americans.

Modern legion

In the 2000s, after the abandonment of conscription, the Spanish Legion once again accepted foreigners into service. Male and female native Spanish speakers, mostly from Central American and South American states, were included.

Today, acceptance to the Spanish Legion is based on the following criteria:
Be a Spanish citizen; although citizens from former Spanish territories also can join (foreign recruits are required to have a valid Spanish residence permit).
Be a citizen in good legal standing
Not be deprived of civil rights
Be at least 18 years of age and not be 29 on the day of joining boot camp.
Be able to pass psychological, physical and medical evaluations

In recent years, the Spanish Legion was involved in Bosnia as part of the SFOR. It also took part in the Iraq War, deploying in Najaf alongside Salvadoran troops, until the new Spanish government of José Luis Rodríguez Zapatero fulfilled its electoral promises by withdrawing Spanish troops from Iraq. The legion units deployed in Iraq were involved in several operations against the insurgency. In 2005, the legion was deployed in Afghanistan as part of the NATO-led International Stabilisation Force (ISAF). In 2006, the 10th Bandera was sent to Southern Lebanon as part of United Nations' Operation UNIFIL.

Present role and deployment
The Spanish Legion is now mostly used in NATO peacekeeping missions. It has 5,000 soldiers in a Brigade of two Tercios (regiments) based in Ronda, Málaga and Viator, Almería (Andalusia). Two other independent tercios are deployed in the Spanish African enclaves of Ceuta and Melilla as part of their respective garrisons. The legion is directly controlled by the Spanish General Staff.

Although the detachment at Málaga was transferred away, each year a company of legionaries from one of the Tercios (regiments) returns to march in the Holy Week procession with the Christ of the Good Death, a life-size effigy of Christ Crucified, adopted by the legion as Patron in the 1920s. It also has its own confraternity with its home chapel located in this historic city, where veterans who served in this unit are counted among its membership. The Legion's detachments also take part in various Holy Week events nationwide, including its military band.

Units constituting modern Spanish Legion
The currently active units of the Spanish Legion are: 
 
 II Spanish Legion Brigade "Rey Alfonso XIII" in Viator
 2nd Spanish Legion Headquarters Bandera
 2nd Spanish Legion Light Armored Cavalry Group "Reyes Católicos"
 3rd Spanish Legion Tercio "Don Juan de Austria"
 VII Spanish Legion Bandera "Valenzuela"
 VIII Spanish Legion Bandera "Colón"
 4th Spanish Legion Tercio "Alejandro Farnesio"
 X Spanish Legion Bandera "Millán Astray"
 2nd Spanish Legion Field Artillery Group
 2nd Spanish Legion Engineer Battalion
 2nd Spanish Legion Logistic Group

In other commands:
 1st Spanish Legion Tercio "Gran Capitán"
 I Spanish Legion Bandera "España"
 2nd Spanish Legion Tercio "Duque de Alba"
 IV Spanish Legion Bandera "Cristo de Lepanto"

Special Forces of the Spanish Legion
The members of this unit, who were (and still mostly are) volunteers from other banderas of the legion, received training in: SCUBA/Maritime Warfare, Arctic and Mountain Warfare, Sabotage and Demolitions, Parachute and HALO techniques, Long Range Reconnaissance, Counter-terrorism and CQB, Vehicle insertion, Sniping and SERE (Survival, Escape, Resistance and Evasion). Much of the training was undertaken at Fort Bragg (USA). In 2002 the BOEL was renamed 19th Special Operations Group "Maderal Oleaga" (GOE-XIX) and was moved to Alicante, and reported directly to Army HQ as part of the Special Operations Command, with recruitment now being in a national basis, with personnel assigned from various Army units. In 2019-20, the battalion returned to the Legion Command but is not part of the Legion Brigade, assigned as the Legion contribution to Army SpecOps.

 19th Special Operations Group "Maderal Oleaga"

Ranks
The military ranks and promotion conditions of the Spanish Legion are the same as those applicable to the remainder of the Spanish Army. Formerly the Legion had its own rank system for non-commissioned officers. The only modern difference is that soldiers (OR-1) in the Legion are referred to as "Caballeros Legionarios" (Legionary Gentlemen). Legionnaires consider this title as a distinction, earned through rigorous training and initiation tests.

Basic training
Basic training lasts four months and takes place in Cáceres or Cádiz. It includes basic military skills, forced marches and a stringent assault course. After the second month, the recruit signs a 2 or 3-year contract. After finishing basic training the recruit joins one of the tercios, in there he receives further training, mostly focused on parading and legionary tradition. This is the same process as in the rest of units in the Spanish army.

Uniforms and equipment of the legion

Uniforms

From its establishment the legion was noted for its plain and simple style of dress, in contrast to the colourful dress uniforms worn by the Peninsular regiments of the Spanish Army until the overthrow of the Monarchy in 1931. This was part of the cult of austerity favoured by a unit that considered itself on more or less continual active service.

The modern legion has the same camouflage dress for active service and ordinary duties as the rest of the Spanish Army but retains the unique, sage green Tropical uniform for semi-formal barrack dress and as the basis of Legion parade uniform. Perhaps the most distinctive feature of the modern legion uniform is the khaki "gorrillo" cap or "chapiri", with red hanging tassel and piping.

Contrary to usual military practice, Legionaries are allowed to sport beards and are permitted to wear their uniforms, both traditional and service, open at the chest.

Equipment

The basic weapons used by the Legion are the same as those used by the rest of the Spanish Army. These include the G36-E rifle, its 40mm grenade launcher modular attachment the AG36, the HK MG4 and MG3 machine guns, and the HK USP 9mm pistol.

Like the rest of the Army, the Legion makes use of crew served weapons such as the M2 Browning machine gun and the SB LAG 40 automatic grenade launcher on their armoured vehicles.

The Legions field artillery group mans L118 105mm Light Guns, Italian wheeled tank destroyers B1 Centauro also are used.

The Legion uses Land Rovers, Spanish-made BMR and VEC-M1, VAMTAC, URO trucks and other vehicles like foreign LMV or RG31.

Esprit de corps
Millán-Astray provided the Legion with a distinctive spirit and symbolism intended to evoke Spain's Imperial and Christian traditions. For instance, the Legion adopted the regimental designation of tercio in memory of the 16th-century Spanish infantry formations that had toppled nations and terrorized the battlefields of Europe in the days of Charles V.  Millán-Astray also revived the Spaniards' ancient feud with the Moors and portrayed his men first as crusaders on an extended Reconquista against Islamic civilization, and later as the saviours of Spain warding off Communism and democratic liberalism defeating the dangerous spectre of 'Eastern Atheism'''.

As a tribute to the old Tercios the Legion coat of arms features, besides the crown, weapons used by the soldiers of these units - the musket, halberd and crossbow.

Traditions
The Legion's customs and traditions include the following:

 Its members, regardless of rank, are titled Caballero Legionario ("Legionary Gentleman"). When women are admitted, they are titled Dama Legionaria ("Legionary Lady").
 A "Mística Legionaria" (Legionary Spirit) (condensed in a twelve-point ":es:Credo Legionario", or "Legionary Creed")
 Legionaries consider themselves Novios de la muerte ("bridegrooms of death"). This nickname is also the title of one of two official hymns of the Legion, the other one being La Canción del Legionario ("The Legionary's Song"). This comes from the first years of the corps, when it only admitted men.
 A Legionary in distress shouts ¡A mí la Legión! ("To me the Legion!"). Those within earshot are bound to help him, regardless of the circumstances. In practice, Legionaries are never supposed to abandon a comrade on the battlefield.
 The Legion's march step is faster than the Spanish military standard, being 160-180 steps per minute in contrast to the usual 90 steps per minute.
During the Holy Week processions in Málaga, the Legionaries carry on their shoulders the image of the Christ of Good Death on Holy Thursday morning. Later that same afternoon, they accompany the procession through the streets of Málaga.
 Under the command of José Millán-Astray, the Legion's motto was ¡Viva la muerte! ("Long live death!") It fell into disuse after the death of Francisco Franco.

 The Legion has had several mascots during its history, such as monkeys, chickens, capercaillies, wild boars, barbary sheep (Spanish: arruis), bears, and parrots. The modern mascot is the Goat of the Spanish Legion. It usually appears at parades and ceremonies, wearing a Legion cap and accompanied by a Legionary, alongside the Legion's marker guard (gastadores), leading the marching troops.
 While throughout its history the Legion has been an essentially infantry force it has also included armoured, artillery and engineer units. During the 1920s and early 1930s, a squadron of mounted lanceros (lancers) formed part of the Legion and in 1982, a mounted section of the Polícia Militar de la Legión was formed to carry the traditional lances and pennants during Holy Week Processions in Málaga to continue the practice.
 The Military bands and Bugle bands of the Legion continue the unit's musical traditions since the 1920s. The bugle bands of the Legion, together with the Regulares, are the only such bands in the Spanish Armed Forces to never use the valved bugle but use the plain bugle instead. Together with the Parachute Light Infantry Brigade, they are also are the only ones to use the small cornetín or the piccolo bugle, used for ordering commands and leading the bugle band in playing bugle calls, fanfares or marches. The medium cornetín is used by the other branches.
 Formerly, the Legion did its marchpasts in the same way as the rest of the Spanish Armed Forces. Today, all officers and the colour guards only do a hand salute and eyes right when marching past. When on the halt and giving full salutes, they only do a hand salute.

Anthems and marches of the legion

 Slow march El Novio de la Muerte (Bridegroom of Death) is the unofficial hymn and regimental slow march of the Spanish Legion, composed in 1921 with words by Juan Costa set to music by Fidel Prado.

 Regimental quick marches and official anthem 
Composed in 1920, La Cancion del Legionario (The Legionnare's Song) is the official quick march and anthem of the Legion. It was composed by Modesto Romero and Infantry Commandant Emilio Guillén Pedemonti. It is played by the military bands and bugle bands of the Legion at the regulation 190 beats that it exclusively uses.

Before it became the legion's official march, Le Madelon and Tercios Heroicos (Heroic Tercios) by Francisco Calles and Antonio Soler were its official march past tunes.

Some notable Legionaries
The following is a list of Legionaries who have gained fame or notoriety inside or outside of the legion.

 Francisco Franco - General and dictator of Spain from 1939 to 1975. Founding deputy commander of the Spanish Legion in 1920, and later commander of the legion from 1923 to 1926.
 Prince Sixtus Henry of Bourbon-Parma (Spanish: Don Sixto Enrique de Borbón-Parma y Borbón-Busset), as Enrique Aranjuez'' in 1965. Carlist pretender to the Spanish throne.
 José Millán-Astray, founder and first commander of the Spanish Legion, served until 1923.
 Enrique San Francisco, actor.
 José Manuel Lara Hernández
 Pedro Marangoni, writer and pilot
 Peter Kemp British Special Operations Executive agent, MI6 agent and writer.
 Pino Rauti, Italian politician
 Nacho Vidal. After leaving around 1994, he became a pornographic actor and director.

See also
Army of Africa (Spain)
FAMET
Foreign legion
Israeli Mahal program
List of Spanish Legionnaires
Regulares

Notes

External links

 Official website
 Spanish Legion
 Specwarnet report - dated information
 La Bandera - 1935 film on the Spanish Foreign Legion

 
Spanish Army
Military units and formations of Spain
Rif War
Military units and formations established in 1920
Military units and formations of the Spanish Civil War
Expatriate military units and formations